Patrick French (?–1748) was an Irish Roman Catholic clergyman who served as the Bishop of Elphin from 1731 to 1748.

References

1748 deaths
Roman Catholic bishops of Elphin
Year of birth unknown